The 7th annual Tenerife International Film Music Festival took place in Santa Cruz de Tenerife, Spain between 5–14 July 2013.
This edition featured as guests the film music composers Marco Beltrami, David Arnold and Alfonso de Vilallonga. The 12 July concert at the Auditorio de Tenerife marked the 50th anniversary of the international premiere of Dr. No, the first film in Ian Fleming's James Bond saga. The closing gala concert on 13 July featured a musical tribute to DreamWorks Animation Studios and the 35th anniversary of the Varèse Sarabande film music label.

The James Bond anniversary concert was broadcast in December 2013 by Spanish Television.

Concerts

Monday 8 July

Hosted in the Auditorium of the University of La Laguna, the Cuarteto Piazzolla ensemble performed compositions by Harold Arlen (The Wizard of Oz), Maurice Jarre (Doctor Zhivago), Glenn Miller (The Aviator), Luis Bacalov (Il Postino), Patrick Doyle (Sense and Sensibility), Ennio Morricone (The Mission) and others.

Musicians:
 Cuarteto Piazzolla
 Violin: Roberto Tubaro
 Violin: Itahisa Darias 
 Viola: Elena Mederos 
 Violoncello: Yurena Darias

Tuesday 9 July

The TimpleLand duo performed adaptations of Disney soundtracks for timple and piano in the Auditorium of the University of La Laguna.

Musicians:
 TimpleLand
 Timple: Beselch Rodríguez
 Piano: Francis Hernández

Wednesday 10 July

Teatro Guimerá hosted the Elmer Bernstein tribute concert performed by Big Band De Canarias, which covered compositions from "The Age of Innocence", "The Magnificent Seven", "Ghostbusters" and others.

Musicians:
 Big Band De Canarias
 Conductor: Kike Perdomo
 Vocals Soloists: Esther Ovejero
 Flute: Sara Andon

Thursday 11 July

Banda Sinfónica del Conservatorio Profesional de Música de Santa Cruz presented at Teatro Guimerá arrangements from "Get Smart", "Austin Powers: International Man of Mystery", "The Polar Express", "The Golden Compass", "The Matrix Reloaded" and "The Dark Knight", conducted by Benigno Cedrés Rodriguez.

Musicians:
 Banda Sinfónica del Conservatorio Profesional de Música de Santa Cruz
 Conductor: Benigno Cedrés Rodriguez

Friday 12 July

Auditorio de Tenerife Adán Martín hosted the Orquesta Sinfónica de Tenerife conducted by Steven Allen Fox which presented in the first half of the program compositions by Marco Beltrami ("Snow Piercer", "Soul Surfer" and "The Wolverine") and David Arnold ("Independence Day", "The Stepford Wives" and "Stargate").

Musicians:
 Orquesta sinfónica de Tenerife
 Conductor: Steven Allen Fox
 Tenerife Film Choir 
 Choir Master: Cristina Farrais

The second half featured the James Bond 50th anniversary concert, including compositions from "Goldfinger", "From Russia With love", "License To Kill", "Casino Royale", "Goldeneye" and "Skyfall".

Musicians:
 Orquesta Sinfónica de Tenerife
 Conductor: Diego Navarro
 Vocal:
 Esther Ovejero
 Chiqui Pérez
 Esther Alfonso
 Lorena García
 Javier J. Díaz
 Fran León

Saturday 13 July

The closing night gala debuted in Auditorio de Tenerife Adán Martín with a tribute to DreamWorks Animation Studios, which included compositions from "Wallace & Gromit in The Curse of the Were-Rabbit", "Chicken Run", "Rise of the Guardians", "Shrek", "How To Train Your Dragon" and "Prince of Egypt".

Musicians:
 Orquesta Sinfónica de Tenerife
 Conducted by Diego Navarro
 Tenerife Film Choir 
 Choir Master: Cristina Farrais
 Vocal Soloists:
 Cristina Farrais
 Esther Ovejero
 Lorena García

The second part of the gala featured the Varèse Sarabande 35th anniversary concert, with an overture encompassing works from "Basic Instinct", "Unforgiven", "Back To The Future, Part III" and "City Slickers", followed by Marco Beltrami's compositions from "I Robot", "Mimic", "Knowing" and "Hellboy". The gala ended with a sci-fi medley of works from "Terminator 2" by Brad Fiedel, "Robocop" by Basil Poledouris, "The Abyss" by Alan Silvestri, "Air Force One" by Jerry Goldsmith, "Aliens" by James Horner, "The Matrix" by Don Davis and "Stargate" by David Arnold.

Musicians:
 Orquesta Sinfónica de Tenerife
 Conducted by Diego Navarro
 Tenerife Film Choir 
 Master Choir: Cristina Farrais
 Soloists:
 Flute: Sara Andon
 Piano: Sophia Unsworth

See also

 Closing notes for the seventh edition

References

External links
 
 RTVE broadcast of Fimucité 7 James Bond's 50th anniversary concert
 RTVE broadcast of Dreamworks Animation Studios tribute concert and the 35th Varèse Sarabande anniversary concert

Canarian culture
Film festivals in Spain
2013 in Spanish cinema
2013 in Spanish music
Tenerife